Charter College is a network of private, for-profit independent institutions of higher education.

Charter College offers programs in healthcare, business, veterinary science, information technology, and select trade careers. Charter operates campuses in five states and offers certificates, associate, and bachelor's degrees. Fully online programs are available for select programs.

History
In the more than 30 years since they opened their doors, Charter has opened campuses in 14 additional cities and has added online degree programs, as well.

In 2016, Charter Institute was developed to bring the Charter education approach to New Mexico.

Accreditation 
Charter College is accredited by the Accrediting Bureau of Health Education Schools to award bachelor of science degrees, associate of applied science degrees, certificates, and non-credit courses. Charter College also holds programmatic accreditation for the Associate of Applied Science in Nursing program from the Accrediting Commission for Education in Nursing.

References

External links
Official website
Charter College Student Portal

Private universities and colleges in Alaska
Education in Anchorage, Alaska
Education in Matanuska-Susitna Borough, Alaska
Universities and colleges in Los Angeles County, California
Universities and colleges in Ventura County, California
Universities and colleges in Bellingham, Washington
Education in Vancouver, Washington
Pasco, Washington
Two-year colleges in the United States
For-profit universities and colleges in the United States
Private universities and colleges in California